Mom Genes: Inside the New Science of Our Ancient Maternal Instinct is a 2021 book by Abigail Tucker that examines motherhood. The book has five "positive" reviews, compared to one "rave" review and one "mixed" review, according to review aggregator Book Marks.

References

2021 non-fiction books
Gallery Books books
English-language books
Motherhood